Regin Vágadal  (born 22 March 1970) is a former strongman from the Faroe Islands.  He was seven times Faroe Islands Strongest Man from 1994 to 2000. He also participated in the World's Strongest Man finals between 1996 and 2000.

Biography 
Vágadal was born on the 22 March 1970 in the Faroe Islands. During his childhood he lived for 3 years in Nuuk Greenland.

At the age of 15, he started working on a shrimp trawler. He worked here until 1989, In 1990 he worked on board a cargo-liner.
That year he also started working as a carpenter with his uncle. During the weekend he had a job as a bouncer.
In 1995 Regin started his study at the Navigation School and completed this with a Masters certificate for ship-master.  
1995 was also the year started training.

In 1996 he was invited to the World's Strongest Man for the first time and made it to the final where he finished 8th. In 1997 he was invited again to the World's Strongest Man but did not make it past the qualifying heats. This year he also competed in the World Muscle Power Classic where he placed third behind Raimonds Bergmanis and Mark Philippi. In 1999 he finished second in Europe's Strongest Man and again competed in the World's Strongest Man but did not make it past the qualifying heats. In 2000 he reached the final of the tournament for the second time where he finished 8th. The following year he competed for the last time in the World's Strongest Man where he did not qualify for the final. He also won  Faroe Islands Strongest Man seven times in a row from 1994 to 2000 and won Iceland's Strongest Man in 1998.

Honours
7 times Faroe Islands Strongest Man (1994–2000)
8th place World's Strongest Man  (1996)
3rd place in "World Muscle Power Champs 1997"
1st place in "Iceland Strongest man 1998"
8th place World's Strongest Man  (2000)
2nd place in "THE ATLANTIC GIANT 1999"
1st place in "THE ATLANTIC GIANT 2000"
1st place in "THE ATLANTIC GIANT 2001"

Personal best:
BenchPress 235 kg
Squat      340 kg
Deadlift   350 kg

References

External links
 Personal website

1970 births
Living people
Faroese strength athletes